Gocup is a town community in the central east part of the Riverina and situated about  north of Tumut and  south of Gundagai on the Gundagai to Tumut Road.

Gocup Post Office opened on 21 October 1885 and closed in 1959.

References

Towns in the Riverina
Towns in New South Wales
Snowy Valleys Council